Cho Dong-geon (趙東建; born 2 February 1986) is a South Korean football player who plays for Hwaseong FC of the K3 League.

On 12 August 2009, he played his first senior match against Paraguay.

Career
In December 2020, Cho departed Sagan Tosu after four seasons.

Club career statistics 
.

Honors

Club
Seongnam Ilhwa Chunma
2010 AFC Champions League Winner
2011 FA Cup Winner

References

External links 
 Profile at Sagan Tosu

 
 

1986 births
Living people
People from Iksan
South Korean footballers
Seongnam FC players
Suwon Samsung Bluewings players
Gimcheon Sangmu FC players
Sagan Tosu players
K League 1 players
J1 League players
Association football forwards